Kasmakty (Qaśmaqtı) is a rural locality (a village) in Abzakovsky Selsoviet, Beloretsky District, Bashkortostan, Russia. The population was 14 as of 2010. There is 1 street.

Geography 
Kasmakty is located 14 km southeast of Beloretsk (the district's administrative centre) by road. Abzakovo is the nearest rural locality.

References 

Rural localities in Beloretsky District